San Felipe incident may refer to:
San Felipe incident (1596), a Spanish ship wrecked in Japan
San Felipe incident (1835), a naval battle between Texas and Mexico